The 2007–08 Xavier Musketeers men's basketball team represented Xavier University in the 2007–08 college basketball season. They were led by head coach Sean Miller in his fourth season at Xavier. The Musketeers were members of the Atlantic 10 Conference and played their home games at the Cintas Center. Xavier finished the season with a record of 30–7, 14–2 in A-10 play to win the regular season championship. The Musketeers lost in the semifinals of the A-10 tournament to Saint Joseph's. They received an at-large bid to the NCAA tournament as the No. 3 seed in the West region. The Musketeers defeated Georgia, Purdue, and West Virginia to advance to the Elite Eight before losing to UCLA.

Roster

Schedule and results 

|-
!colspan=9 style=| Regular season

|-
!colspan=9 style=| A-10 tournament

|-
!colspan=9 style=|NCAA tournament

Rankings

References

Xavier
Xavier Musketeers men's basketball seasons
Xavier
Xavier Musketeers Men's Basketball Team
Xavier Musketeers Men's Basketball Team